The German Film Award,  also known as Lola after its prize statuette, is the national film award of Germany. It is presented at an annual ceremony honouring cinematic achievements in the German film industry. Besides being the most important film award in Germany, it is also the most highly endowed German cultural award, with cash prizes in its current 20 categories totalling nearly three million euros.

From 1951 to 2004 it was awarded by a commission, but since 2005 the award has been organized by the German Film Academy (Deutsche Filmakademie). The Federal Commissioner for Cultural and Media Affairs has been responsible for the administration of the prize since 1999. The awards ceremony is traditionally held in Berlin.

History 
The award was created in 1951 by the Federal Ministry of the Interior and was first given out during the Berlin Film Festival. A practice that was kept for the upcoming decades. Since 1999 it is commissioned by the Federal Government Commissioner for Culture and the Media.

 In the first years the awards had numerous trophies that were handed out for different categories. Aside from the main categories for Best Picture, Director and Screenplay most others from the inaugural edition have been short lived such as Film that promote democratic values due to the constant change of the awards constitution in the early years. As a rule stated that awards would only be awarded for outstanding achievements, not every category had a winner each year. Over time, the award in the shape of a film tape became the most common trophy, either in gold or silver. The Golden Bowl became the highest honour for Best Picture, however due to not being handed out for more than 17 years, the award was abolished in 1996.

Due to the confusing mechanism as well as changing categories, the award lost its relevance. With only a press conference and no televised broadcast, it did not attract the public's interest in West Germany. Since the reunification of Germany in 1990, constants efforts have been made to underline the award's significance as a national correlation to similar awards honours such as the Academy Awards or the Césars. In 1995 for the first time, winners were announced during a glamorous telecast in Friedrichstadt-Palast, one of the most prestigious venues of former East-Berlin. In the following years, other locations were chosen that were symbolic for the once divided city such as the Berlin Tempelhof Airport or the Brandenburg Gate.

Since 1999, the various category winners are awarded a statuette, the LOLA. The name refers to Marlene Dietrich's role in Der blaue Engel, Rainer Werner Fassbinder's film Lola and Tom Tykwer's very successful movie Lola rennt.

Mechthild Schmidt, Partner of HouseWorks digital media, New York about her 1999 design: "I wanted to symbolize motion. Film IS movement. I wanted the statue to express confidence without being stern, strength without being static. It was important to me to give the "Deutschen Filmpreis" its own identity, not trying to borrow what other awards already successfully symbolize. While the Oscar is the strong, firm standing fighter and winner, I wanted the Filmprize statue to symbolize the dynamics of movement, the muse, the inspiration necessary to make a work of art, to become a winner. The movement is carried through to the asymmetrical conical base.
Stylistically, I was looking for a timeless modern design as well as a historical reference to the first golden era of German film, the Art Deco in the 1920s."

From 1999 to 2002 the show was televised by a private broadcaster ProSieben. Since 2003 it has rotated each year between the two major German public broadcasters ARD and ZDF.

Before the founding of the German Film Academy (Deutsche Filmakademie) in 2005 a single prize was awarded for the technical categories of cinematography, film editing, production design, art direction and musical score in the category  "Outstanding Singular Achievement".

Selection process 

Borrowing from the American model, the awards have been made by an academy, the Deutsche Filmakademie, since 2005. The academy replaces a much-criticised jury which was constituted according to the principle of political proportionality, and on which politicians and clergymen also sat. Now the jury consists of the members of the German Film Academy, which makes them a well specialised jury.

The selection process has three main steps:
 Registration and pre-selection
 Nomination
 Election of the award winners

Nominations are decided by a pre-determined jury from each branch. Except for the film categories, usually three nominees are announced. More nominees are allowed in case of a tie. The nominations for the film categories are endowed with 100.000 Euro (Documentary), 125.000 Euro (Best Children's Film) and 250.000 Euro (Feature Film). Winners in each individual categories get 10.000 Euro, whereas the main winner in the Film category gets 500.000 Euro (including the nomination reward). The Best Film category features six nominees with the three most voted winning a bronze, silver and gold award respectively.

Categories

Merit awards 

 Best Fiction Film
 Best Documentary Film
 Best Children's Film
 Best Director
 Best Screenplay
 Best Actress
 Best Actor
 Best Supporting Actress
 Best Supporting Actor
 Best Cinematography
 Best Editing
 Best Costume Design
 Best Production Design
 Best Sound Editing
 Best Score
 Best Make-Up
 Best Visual Effects and Animation

Special awards 

 Honorary Award for Outstanding Contributions to German Cinema
 Bernd Eichinger Memorial Award
 Audience Award for the highest grossing Film of the Year

Retired awards 

 Best Foreign Film
 Audience Award for Best Picture and Actor/Actress

Ceremonies

Trivia

Films that received six or more German Film Awards

"Big Five" winners and nominees

Winners 
Toni Erdmann (2016)
Best Film: Toni Erdmann
Best Director: Maren Ade
Best Actor: Peter Simonischek
Best Actress: Sandra Hüller
Best Writing: Maren Ade

System Crasher (2020)
Best Film: System Crasher
Best Director: Nora Fingscheidt
Best Actor: Albrecht Schuch
Best Actress: Helena Zengel
Best Writing: Nora Fingscheidt

Nominees 
Four awards won
Good Bye Lenin (2002): Best Actress (Katrin Saß)
Go for Zucker! (2004): Best Actress (Hannelore Elsner)
The White Ribbon (2009): Best Actress (Susanne Lothar)

Three awards won
Stopped on Track (2011): Best Actress (Steffi Kühnert) and Writing (Andreas Dresen and Cooky Ziesche)

Actors with two or more competitive awards

See also 
 Bayerischer Filmpreis
 Berlin International Film Festival
 Bogey Awards
 Cinema of Germany

Notes

References

External links 
  
  deutsche-filmakademie.de Database of recipients 1951 – today
  Promotion of German Film and Cinema by the German Federal Government
  Lola — prizes in detail  List of Lola categories and associated monetary awards

 
Awards established in 1951